Wyoming is a 1928 American silent Western film directed by W. S. Van Dyke and written by Ruth Cummings, Madeleine Ruthven and Ross B. Wills. The film stars Tim McCoy, Dorothy Sebastian, Charles Bell, William Fairbanks and Chief John Big Tree. The film was released on March 24, 1928, by Metro-Goldwyn-Mayer.

Cast 
 Tim McCoy as Lt. Jack Colton
 Dorothy Sebastian as Samantha Jerusha Farrell
 Charles Bell as Chief Big Cloud
 William Fairbanks as Buffalo Bill
 Chief John Big Tree as An Indian 
 Goes in the Lodge as Chief Chapulti
 Blue Washington as Mose
 Bert Henderson as Oswald

References

External links 
 

1928 films
1920s English-language films
1928 Western (genre) films
Metro-Goldwyn-Mayer films
Films directed by W. S. Van Dyke
American black-and-white films
Silent American Western (genre) films
1920s American films